Chelakkara State assembly constituency is one of the 140 state legislative assembly constituencies in Kerala. It is also one of the 7 state legislative assembly constituencies included in the Alathur Lok Sabha constituency. As of the 2021 assembly election, the current MLA is K. Radhakrishnan of Communist Party of India (Marxist).

Local self governed segments
{
  "type": "ExternalData",
  "service": "geoline",
  "properties": {
    "stroke": "#0000ff",
    "stroke-width": 2
  },
  "query": "\nSELECT ?id ?idLabel (concat('', ?idLabel, '') as ?title) WHERE\n{\n?id wdt:P7938 wd:Q5089791. # is a district\nSERVICE wikibase:label { bd:serviceParam wikibase:language 'en'.\n?id rdfs:label ?idLabel .\n}\n}"}

Chelakkara Niyamasabha constituency is composed of the following local self-governed segments:

Members of Legislative Assembly 
The following list contains all members of Kerala legislative assembly who have represented the constituency:

Key

Election results

2021 Niyamasabha Election 
There were 1,98,086 registered voters in the constituency for the 2021 election.

2016 Niyamasabha Election 
There were 1,90,919 registered voters in the constituency for the 2016 election.

2011 Niyamasabha Election 
There were 1,73,746 registered voters in the constituency for the 2011 election.

See also 
 Chelakkara
 Thrissur district
 List of constituencies of the Kerala Legislative Assembly
 2016 Kerala Legislative Assembly election

References

Assembly constituencies of Kerala

State assembly constituencies in Thrissur district